Martin John Jones (born 21 April 1967) is a British former mountain runner who won the 1992 (short distance) and 1993 World Mountain Running Championships.

He also represented his country on other surfaces, competing in the World Cross Country Championships in 1994 and 1995 and running for England in the 10,000 metres on the track in the 1994 Commonwealth Games, where he finished in fourth place. He ran internationally in road races too, including the 1993 World Half Marathon Championships.

References

External links
 Martin Jones profile at Association of Road Racing Statisticians

1967 births
Living people
Place of birth missing (living people)
British male mountain runners
English male long-distance runners
Commonwealth Games competitors for England
World Mountain Running Championships winners
Athletes (track and field) at the 1994 Commonwealth Games